The 2012–13 season was Queen of the South's first season back in the Scottish Second Division after an absence of a decade after the club's relegation from the Scottish First Division at the end of the 2011–12 season. Queens also competed in the Challenge Cup, League Cup and the Scottish Cup.

Summary
Queen of the South finished first in the Second Division to be crowned champions and were promoted to the Scottish Championship. The club were also the winners of the Challenge Cup to complete a historic double for the club and also reached the third round of the League Cup and the fourth round of the Scottish Cup.

Results & fixtures

Pre season

Scottish Second Division

Scottish Challenge Cup

Scottish League Cup

Scottish Cup

Player statistics

Captains

Squad 
Last updated 27 July 2013

|}

Disciplinary record
Includes all competitive matches.
Last updated 27 July 2013

Manager of the Month Awards

Last updated 14 June 2013

Top Scorers 
Last updated on 4 May 2013

Clean sheets
{| class="wikitable" style="font-size: 95%; text-align: center;"
|-
!width=15|
!width=15|
!width=15|
!width=150|Name
!width=80|Second Division
!width=80|Scottish Cup
!width=80|League Cup
!width=80|Challenge Cup
!width=80|Total
|-
|1
|GK
|
|Lee Robinson
|19
|1
|1
|1
|22
|-
|
|
|
! Totals !! 19 !! 1 !! 1 !! 1 !! 22

Team statistics

League table

Division summary

Transfers

Players in

Players out

See also
List of Queen of the South F.C. seasons

References

2012-13
Queen of the South